Феникс (Phoenix) is the eleventh studio album by Russian heavy metal band Ария (Aria), released in 2011, and the first to feature vocalist Михаил Житняков (Mikhail Zhitnyakov).

Track listing

Personnel
 Mikhail Zhitnyakov - Vocals
 Vladimir Holstinin - Guitar
 Sergey Popov - Guitar
 Vitaly Dubinin - Bass
 Maxim Udalov - Drums
Sergey Lukankin - Photography
Tommy Hansen - Producer, Mixing, Mastering
Maxim Udalov - Engineering
Igor Lobanov - Lyrics (4, 7, 9), Design
Margarita Pushkina - Lyrics (1-3, 5, 6, 8, 10)
Leo Hao - Cover art
Viktor Polyakov - Design

References

Aria (band) albums